Homotima is a genus of moth in the family Gelechiidae. It contains the species Homotima purpurata, which is found in New Guinea.

References

Gelechiinae